Molecular Biology Reports is a monthly peer-reviewed scientific journal covering research on normal and pathological molecular processes.

Abstracting and indexing
The journal is abstracted and indexed in:

According to the Journal Citation Reports. The journal has a 2020 impact factor of 2.316.

References

External links

English-language journals
Molecular and cellular biology journals
Springer Science+Business Media academic journals
Monthly journals
Publications established in 1974